Joab Logan "Joe" McManus (September 7, 1887 – December 23, 1955) was a professional baseball pitcher who played in one game for the Cincinnati Reds on April 12, .

External links

1887 births
1955 deaths
Cincinnati Reds players
Major League Baseball pitchers
Baseball players from Illinois
Ottawa Senators (baseball) players
Nashville Vols players
Durham Bulls players
Norfolk Tars players
Augusta Tourists players
Raleigh Capitals players
Canton Chinks players
Macomb Potters players